Vista High School is a school in Cape Town, Western Cape, South Africa.

External links
 

Schools in Cape Town